Yaqubabad (also Romanized as Ya‘qūbābād; also known as Ya‘ghoob Abad) is a village in Bidak Rural District, in the Central District of Abadeh County, Fars Province, Iran. At the 2006 census, its population was 443, in 121 families.

References 

Populated places in Abadeh County